Ashland Avenue is a north-south street in Chicago, in whose grid system it is 1600W. It is one of the major streets on the city's west side.

Transportation
On the Chicago "L", Ashland is served by two stations on the Green Line, one on the Lake Street Elevated and the other on the Englewood branch; the Lake Street station is also served by the Pink Line. The Orange Line also has a station serving Ashland Avenue.

In the late 19th century, a streetcar ran on Ashland Avenue from 22nd Street up to Roosevelt Street, where it turned west to run north from Paulina Avenue to avoid running on a boulevard, returning to Ashland Avenue via Lake Street. This was extended south to Archer Avenue in 1896, and on September 4, 1908, was extended to connect with another route south to 70th Street. Simultaneous with the 70th Street extension was a northward one to Southport Street via Clybourn Avenue, which was further extended to Clark Street on October 16, 1912. Further extensions, including the absorption of a shuttle route, created a crosstown through-route from Clark Street down to 87th Street starting November 1, 1916. This became known as "Through Route 9" (TR 9) in 1924. By the early- to mid-20th century, Ashland was one of the "Big Five" streetcar lines, which had the highest ridership, got the most amentities and had the shortest wait times. As of 1928, TR 9 had owl service between 1 and 4:45 a.m., wherein streetcars ran every fifteen minutes; during the day, streetcar lines in Chicago typically had intervals of between eight and fifteen minutes per car. Buses replaced streetcars on weekends starting May 11, 1952, and altogether on February 13, 1954.

References

Works cited

External links

Streets in Chicago